The history of quantum mechanics is a fundamental part of the history of modern physics. Quantum mechanics' history, as it interlaces with the history of quantum chemistry, began essentially with a number of different scientific discoveries: the 1838 discovery of cathode rays by Michael Faraday; the 1859–60 winter statement of the black-body radiation problem by Gustav Kirchhoff; the 1877 suggestion by Ludwig Boltzmann that the energy states of a physical system could be discrete; the discovery of the photoelectric effect by Heinrich Hertz in 1887; and the 1900 quantum hypothesis by Max Planck that any energy-radiating atomic system can theoretically be divided into a number of discrete "energy elements" ε (Greek letter epsilon) such that each of these energy elements is proportional to the frequency ν with which each of them individually radiate energy, as defined by the following formula:
 
where h is a numerical value called Planck's constant.

Then, Albert Einstein in 1905, in order to explain the photoelectric effect previously reported by Heinrich Hertz in 1887, postulated consistently with Max Planck's quantum hypothesis that light itself is made of individual quantum particles, which in 1926 came to be called photons by Gilbert N. Lewis. The photoelectric effect was observed upon shining light of particular wavelengths on certain materials, such as metals, which caused electrons to be ejected from those materials only if the light quantum energy was greater than the work function of the metal's surface.

The phrase "quantum mechanics" was coined (in German, Quantenmechanik) by the group of physicists including Max Born, Werner Heisenberg, and Wolfgang Pauli, at the University of Göttingen in the early 1920s, and was first used in Born's 1924 paper "Zur Quantenmechanik".  In the years to follow, this theoretical basis slowly began to be applied to chemical structure, reactivity, and bonding.

Predecessors and the "old quantum theory"
During the early 19th century, chemical research by John Dalton and Amedeo Avogadro lent weight to the atomic theory of matter, an idea that James Clerk Maxwell, Ludwig Boltzmann and others built upon to establish the kinetic theory of gases. The successes of kinetic theory gave further credence to the idea that matter is composed of atoms, yet the theory also had shortcomings that would only be resolved by the development of quantum mechanics. The existence of atoms was not universally accepted among physicists or chemists; Ernst Mach, for example, was a staunch anti-atomist.

Ludwig Boltzmann suggested in 1877 that the energy levels of a physical system, such as a molecule, could be discrete (rather than continuous). Boltzmann's rationale for the presence of discrete energy levels in molecules such as those of iodine gas had its origins in his statistical thermodynamics and statistical mechanics theories and was backed up by mathematical arguments, as would also be the case twenty years later with the first quantum theory put forward by Max Planck.

In 1900, the German physicist Max Planck, who had never believed in discrete atoms, reluctantly introduced the idea that energy is quantized in order to derive a formula for the observed frequency dependence of the energy emitted by a black body, called Planck's law, that included a Boltzmann distribution (applicable in the classical limit). Planck's law can be stated as follows:
 
where
 I(ν, T) is the energy per unit time (or the power) radiated per unit area of emitting surface in the normal direction per unit solid angle per unit frequency by a black body at temperature T;
 h is the Planck constant;
 c is the speed of light in vacuum;
 k is the Boltzmann constant;
 ν (nu) is the frequency of the electromagnetic radiation;
 T is the temperature of the body in kelvins.

The earlier Wien approximation may be derived from Planck's law by assuming .

In 1905, Albert Einstein used kinetic theory to explain Brownian motion. French physicist Jean Baptiste Perrin used the model in Einstein's paper to experimentally determine the mass, and the dimensions, of atoms, thereby giving direct empirical verification of the atomic theory. Also in 1905, Einstein explained the photoelectric effect by postulating that light, or more generally all electromagnetic radiation, can be divided into a finite number of "energy quanta" that are localized points in space.  From the introduction section of his March 1905 quantum paper "On a heuristic viewpoint concerning the emission and transformation of light", Einstein states:

This statement has been called the most revolutionary sentence written by a physicist of the twentieth century. These energy quanta later came to be called "photons", a term introduced by Gilbert N. Lewis in 1926. The idea that each photon had to consist of energy in terms of quanta was a remarkable achievement; it effectively solved the problem of black-body radiation attaining infinite energy, which occurred in theory if light were to be explained only in terms of waves. 

An important step was taken in the evolution of quantum theory at the first Solvay Congress of 1911. There the top physicists of the scientific community met to discuss the problem of “Radiation and the Quanta.” By this time the Ernest Rutherford model of the atom had been published, but much of the discussion involving atomic structure revolved around the quantum model of Arthur Haas in 1910. Also, at the Solvay Congress in 1911 Hendrik Lorentz suggested after Einstein’s talk on quantum structure that the energy of a rotator be set equal to nhv. This was followed by other quantum models such as the John William Nicholson model of 1912 which was nuclear and discretized angular momentum. Nicholson had introduced the spectra into his atomic model by using the oscillations of electrons in a nuclear atom perpendicular to the orbital plane thereby maintaining stability. Nicholson’s atomic spectra identified many unattributed lines in solar and nebular spectra.

In 1913, Bohr explained the spectral lines of the hydrogen atom, again by using quantization, in his paper of July 1913 On the Constitution of Atoms and Molecules in which he discussed and cited the Nicholson model. In the Bohr model, the hydrogen atom is pictured as a heavy, positively-charged nucleus orbited by a light, negatively-charged electron. The electron can only exist in certain, discretely separated orbits, labeled by their angular momentum, which is restricted to be an integer multiple of the reduced Planck constant. 
The model's key success lay in explaining the Rydberg formula for the spectral emission lines of atomic hydrogen by using the transitions of electrons between orbits. While the Rydberg formula had been known experimentally, it did not gain a theoretical underpinning until the Bohr model was introduced. Not only did the Bohr model explain the reasons for the structure of the Rydberg formula, it also provided a justification for the fundamental physical constants that make up the formula's empirical results.

Moreover, the application of Planck's quantum theory to the electron allowed Ștefan Procopiu in 1911–1913, and subsequently Niels Bohr in 1913, to calculate the magnetic moment of the electron, which was later called the "magneton"; similar quantum computations, but with numerically quite different values, were subsequently made possible for both the magnetic moments of the proton and the neutron that are three orders of magnitude smaller than that of the electron.

These theories, though successful, were strictly phenomenological: during this time, there was no rigorous justification for quantization, aside, perhaps, from Henri Poincaré's discussion of Planck's theory in his 1912 paper . They are collectively known as the old quantum theory.

The phrase "quantum physics" was first used in Johnston's Planck's Universe in Light of Modern Physics (1931).

In 1923, the French physicist Louis de Broglie put forward his theory of matter waves by stating that particles can exhibit wave characteristics and vice versa. This theory was for a single particle and derived from special relativity theory. Building on de Broglie's approach, modern quantum mechanics was born in 1925, when the German physicists Werner Heisenberg, Max Born, and Pascual Jordan developed matrix mechanics and the Austrian physicist Erwin Schrödinger invented wave mechanics and the non-relativistic Schrödinger equation as an approximation of the generalised case of de Broglie's theory. Schrödinger subsequently showed that the two approaches were equivalent. The first applications of quantum mechanics to physical systems were the algebraic determination of the hydrogen spectrum by Wolfgang Pauli and the treatment of diatomic molecules by Lucy Mensing.

Modern quantum mechanics
Heisenberg formulated an early version of the uncertainty principle in 1927, analyzing a thought experiment where one attempts to measure an electron's position and momentum simultaneously. However, Heisenberg did not give precise mathematical definitions of what the "uncertainty" in these measurements meant, a step that would be taken soon after by Earle Hesse Kennard, Wolfgang Pauli, and Hermann Weyl. Starting around 1927, Paul Dirac began the process of unifying quantum mechanics with special relativity by proposing the Dirac equation for the electron. The Dirac equation achieves the relativistic description of the wavefunction of an electron that Schrödinger failed to obtain. It predicts electron spin and led Dirac to predict the existence of the positron. He also pioneered the use of operator theory, including the influential bra–ket notation, as described in his famous 1930 textbook. During the same period, Hungarian polymath John von Neumann formulated the rigorous mathematical basis for quantum mechanics as the theory of linear operators on Hilbert spaces, as described in his likewise famous 1932 textbook. These, like many other works from the founding period, still stand, and remain widely used.

The field of quantum chemistry was pioneered by physicists Walter Heitler and Fritz London, who published a study of the covalent bond of the hydrogen molecule in 1927. Quantum chemistry was subsequently developed by a large number of workers, including the American theoretical chemist Linus Pauling at Caltech, and John C. Slater into various theories such as Molecular Orbital Theory or Valence Theory.

Quantum field theory
Beginning in 1927, researchers attempted to apply quantum mechanics to fields instead of single particles, resulting in quantum field theories. Early workers in this area include P.A.M. Dirac, W. Pauli, V. Weisskopf, and P. Jordan. This area of research culminated in the formulation of quantum electrodynamics by R.P. Feynman, F. Dyson, J. Schwinger, and S. Tomonaga during the 1940s. Quantum electrodynamics describes a quantum theory of electrons, positrons, and the electromagnetic field, and served as a model for subsequent quantum field theories.

The theory of quantum chromodynamics was formulated beginning in the early 1960s. The theory as we know it today was formulated by Politzer, Gross and Wilczek in 1975.

Building on pioneering work by Schwinger, Higgs and Goldstone, the physicists Glashow, Weinberg and Salam independently showed how the weak nuclear force and quantum electrodynamics could be merged into a single electroweak force, for which they received the 1979 Nobel Prize in Physics.

Quantum information

Quantum information science developed in the latter decades of the 20th century, beginning with theoretical results like Holevo's theorem, the concept of generalized measurements or POVMs, the proposal of quantum key distribution by Bennett and Brassard, and Shor's algorithm.

Founding experiments
Thomas Young's double-slit experiment demonstrating the wave nature of light. (c. 1801)
Henri Becquerel discovers radioactivity. (1896)
J. J. Thomson's cathode ray tube experiments (discovers the electron and its negative charge). (1897)
The study of black-body radiation between 1850 and 1900, which could not be explained without quantum concepts.
The photoelectric effect: Einstein explained this in 1905 (and later received a Nobel prize for it) using the concept of photons, particles of light with quantized energy.
Robert Millikan's oil-drop experiment, which showed that electric charge occurs as quanta (whole units). (1909)
Ernest Rutherford's gold foil experiment disproved the plum pudding model of the atom which suggested that the mass and positive charge of the atom are almost uniformly distributed. This led to the planetary model of the atom (1911).
James Franck and Gustav Hertz's electron collision experiment shows that energy absorption by mercury atoms is quantized. (1914)
Otto Stern and Walther Gerlach conduct the Stern–Gerlach experiment, which demonstrates the quantized nature of particle spin. (1920)
Arthur Compton with Compton scattering experiment (1923)
Clinton Davisson and Lester Germer demonstrate the wave nature of the electron in the electron diffraction experiment. (1927)
Carl David Anderson with the discovery positron (1932), validated Paul Dirac's theoretical prediction of this particle (1928)
Lamb–Retherford experiment discovered Lamb shift (1947), which led to the development of quantum electrodynamics.
Clyde L. Cowan and Frederick Reines confirm the existence of the neutrino in the neutrino experiment. (1955)
Clauss Jönsson's double-slit experiment with electrons. (1961)
The quantum Hall effect, discovered in 1980 by Klaus von Klitzing. The quantized version of the Hall effect has allowed for the definition of a new practical standard for electrical resistance and for an extremely precise independent determination of the fine-structure constant.
The experimental verification of quantum entanglement by John Clauser and Stuart Freedman. (1972)
The Mach–Zehnder interferometer experiment conducted by Paul Kwiat, Harold Wienfurter, Thomas Herzog, Anton Zeilinger, and Mark Kasevich, providing experimental verification of the Elitzur–Vaidman bomb tester, proving interaction-free measurement is possible. (1994)

See also

Golden age of physics
Einstein's thought experiments
History of quantum field theory
History of chemistry
History of molecular theory
History of thermodynamics
Timeline of atomic and subatomic physics

References

Further reading
 
 
 
 Greenberger, Daniel, Hentschel, Klaus, Weinert, Friedel (Eds.) Compendium of Quantum Physics. Concepts, Experiments, History and Philosophy, New York: Springer, 2009. .
 
 
 F. Bayen, M. Flato, C. Fronsdal, A. Lichnerowicz and D. Sternheimer, Deformation theory and quantization I,and II, Ann. Phys. (N.Y.), 111 (1978) pp. 61–151.
 D. Cohen, An Introduction to Hilbert Space and Quantum Logic, Springer-Verlag, 1989. This is a thorough and well-illustrated introduction.
 
 A. Gleason. Measures on the Closed Subspaces of a Hilbert Space, Journal of Mathematics and Mechanics, 1957.
 R. Kadison. Isometries of Operator Algebras, Annals of Mathematics, Vol. 54, pp. 325–38, 1951
 G. Ludwig. Foundations of Quantum Mechanics, Springer-Verlag, 1983.
 G. Mackey. Mathematical Foundations of Quantum Mechanics, W. A. Benjamin, 1963 (paperback reprint by Dover 2004).
 R. Omnès. Understanding Quantum Mechanics, Princeton University Press, 1999. (Discusses logical and philosophical issues of quantum mechanics, with careful attention to the history of the subject).
 N. Papanikolaou. Reasoning Formally About Quantum Systems: An Overview, ACM SIGACT News, 36(3), pp. 51–66, 2005.
 C. Piron. Foundations of Quantum Physics,  W. A. Benjamin, 1976.
 Hermann Weyl. The Theory of Groups and Quantum Mechanics, Dover Publications, 1950.
 A. Whitaker. The New Quantum Age: From Bell's Theorem to Quantum Computation and Teleportation, Oxford University Press, 2011, 
 Stephen Hawking. The Dreams that Stuff is Made of, Running Press, 2011, 
 A. Douglas Stone. Einstein and the Quantum, the Quest of the Valiant Swabian, Princeton University Press, 2006.
 Richard P. Feynman. QED: The Strange Theory of Light and Matter. Princeton University Press, 2006. Print.

External links

A History of Quantum Mechanics
A Brief History of Quantum Mechanics
Homepage of the Quantum History Project

History of chemistry
History of physics

zh:物理学史#量子理论